Nikolay Pavlovich Okhlopkov (15 May 1900, in Irkutsk – 8 January 1967, in Moscow), was a Soviet and Russian actor and theatre director who patterned his work after Meyerhold. People's Artist of the USSR (1948).

Okhlopkov was born in Irkutsk, Siberia and started his acting career there in 1918. Since 1930, he directed the Realistic Theatre in Moscow, although his directing style was hardly realistic: he was the first to place spectators on the stage around the actors, in order to restore intimacy between the audience and the company. In 1938, his theatre was closed and he moved to the Vakhtangov Theatre. In 1943 he established the Mayakovsky Theatre, which continues his traditions to this day. Okhlopkov was awarded six Stalin Prizes. He also directed a production of Hamlet at the Moscow Art Theatre in 1954, the first time this play was staged there since World War II.

Selected filmography
The Bay of Death (1926)
Lenin in October (1937)
Alexander Nevsky (1938)
Lenin in 1918 (1939)
Yakov Sverdlov (1940)
Kutuzov (1943)
Light over Russia (1947)
Tale of a True Man (1948)
Far from Moscow (1950)
The Lights of Baku (1950)

References

External links

Official site of the Mayakovsky Theatre 

1900 births
1967 deaths
Stalin Prize winners
People's Artists of the RSFSR
People's Artists of the USSR
Recipients of the Order of Lenin
Recipients of the Order of the Red Banner of Labour
Recipients of the Order of the Red Star
Soviet theatre directors
Russian male film actors
Soviet male film actors
Burials at Novodevichy Cemetery